Netai Charan Chakravarty Homoeopathic Medical College & Hospital is a homoeopathic medical college in Howrah, West Bengal, India. It offers the Bachelor of Homeopathic Medicine and Surgery (BHMS) degree course. The college is recognized by the Central Council of Homoeopathy (CCH), Ministry of Ayush and affiliated with the West Bengal University of Health Sciences. This college was established in 1983.

See also

References

External links
 

1983 establishments in West Bengal
Educational institutions established in 1983
Homeopathic hospitals
Hospitals established in 1983
Hospitals in West Bengal
Universities and colleges in Howrah district
Homoeopathic Medical Colleges in West Bengal
Affiliates of West Bengal University of Health Sciences